The Extraordinary and Plenipotentiary Ambassador of Peru to the Republic of Honduras is the official representative of the Republic of Peru to the Republic of Honduras.

Both countries established relations during the Filibuster War and have maintained them since. Until the 1930s, the representative in Costa Rica was also accredited to other countries in Central America.

List of representatives

See also
List of ambassadors of Peru to Mexico
List of ambassadors of Peru to Central America
List of ambassadors of Peru to Costa Rica
List of ambassadors of Peru to El Salvador
List of ambassadors of Peru to Guatemala
List of ambassadors of Peru to Nicaragua
List of ambassadors of Peru to Panama

References

Honduras
Peru